Le Roy Airport is a public use airport in Genesee County, New York, United States. It is located two nautical miles (3.7 km) east of the central business district of the Le Roy, a village in the Town of Le Roy. According to the FAA's National Plan of Integrated Airport Systems for 2007–2011, it is categorized as a reliever airport.

Although most U.S. airports use the same three-letter location identifier for the FAA and IATA, this airport is assigned 5G0 by the FAA but has no designation from the IATA.

On Sunday, October 27, 2019, at approximately 3PM, four people were injured when a single-engine Beechcraft Bonanza  crashed on takeoff from the airport.

Facilities and aircraft 
It has one runway designated 10/28 with an asphalt surface measuring 3854 by 60 feet (1175 x 18 m).

For the 12-month period ending June 22, 2006, the airport had 14,268 aircraft operations, an average of 39 per day: 98% general aviation, 1% air taxi and 1% military. At that time there were 19 aircraft based at this airport: 100% single-engine.

References

External links 
 Le Roy Airport (5G0) at NYSDOT Airport Directory
 Aerial photo as of April 1995 from USGS The National Map
 
 

Airports in New York (state)
Transportation in Genesee County, New York
Buildings and structures in Genesee County, New York